Raw and Un-Kutt is the third studio album by Kansas City rapper Kutt Calhoun, released on June 8, 2010. The album debuted at #162 on the "Billboard 200" chart in its first week of release.

"Naked (Boom Boom Room)" and "Get Kutt" from the album were released as singles. Features include Brotha Lynch Hung, E-40, Joe Budden, Tech N9ne and Too Short.

On May 26, 2010, XXL premiered the video for "Naked (Boom Boom Room)" on their website.

The track "Same OG" was supposed to feature Bun B alongside BG Bulletwound. Bun B was unable to record his verse in time, so the song was cut from the album. A version without Bun B was given away as a bonus track.

Track listing

See also
Kutt Calhoun discography

References

Kutt Calhoun albums
2010 albums
Albums produced by Seven (record producer)
Strange Music albums